Ras association domain family member 10 is a protein that in humans is encoded by the RASSF10 gene.

References

Further reading